Proprotein convertase 2 (PC2) also known as prohormone convertase 2 or neuroendocrine convertase 2 (NEC2) is a serine protease and proprotein convertase PC2, like proprotein convertase 1 (PC1), is an enzyme responsible for the first step in the maturation of many neuroendocrine peptides from their precursors, such as the conversion of proinsulin to insulin intermediates. To generate the bioactive form of insulin (and many other peptides), a second step involving the removal of C-terminal basic residues is required; this step is mediated by carboxypeptidases E and/or D.  PC2 plays only a minor role in the first step of insulin biosynthesis, but a greater role in the first step of glucagon biosynthesis compared to PC1. PC2 binds to the neuroendocrine protein named 7B2, and if this protein is not present, proPC2 cannot become enzymatically active. 7B2 accomplishes this by preventing the aggregation of proPC2 to inactivatable forms.  The C-terminal domain of 7B2 also inhibits PC2 activity until it is cleaved into smaller inactive forms that lack carboxy-terminal basic residues.  Thus, 7B2 is both an activator and an inhibitor of PC2. PC2 has been identified in a number of animals, including C. elegans.

In humans, proprotein convertase 2 is encoded by the PCSK2 gene.  It is related to the bacterial enzyme subtilisin, and altogether there are 9 different subtilisin-like genes in mammals:   furin, PACE4, PC4, PC5/6, PC7/8, PCSK9, and SKI1/S1P.

References

Further reading

External links 
 

EC 3.4.21